The Lunda (Balunda, Luunda, Ruund) are a Bantu ethnic group that originated in what is now the Democratic Republic of the Congo along the Kalanyi River and formed the Kingdom of Lunda in the 17th century under their ruler, Mwata Yamvo or Mwaant Yav, with their capital at Musumba. From there they spread widely through Katanga and into Eastern Angola, north-western Zambia (the Kanongesha-Lunda and the Ishindi-Lunda, Gabon, Republic of Congo) and the Luapula valley of Zambia (the Eastern Lunda or Kazembe-Lunda).

History

The Lunda were allied to the Luba, and their migrations and conquests spawned a number of  tribes such as the Luvale of the upper Zambezi and the Kasanje on the upper Kwango River of Angola.

The Lunda people's heartland was rich in the natural resources of rivers, lakes, forests and savannah. Its people were fishermen and farmers, and they prospered.  They grew maize, millet, yams, sorghum, squash, beans, sweet potatoes, oil palms and tobacco, and were  palm wine drinkers. Their traders came into contact with the Portuguese, and Arab and Swahili traders of East Africa. They played a large role in the slave and ivory trade that moved goods and people from central Africa to the coasts for export. 

The Lunda were nomadics until the 17th. The people of the Lunda Kingdom believed in Nzambi or Nzamb Katang as a Supreme Creator of the world who created everything of existence on earth. Their religion did not address Nzambi directly, but through the spirits of their ancestors.  Until the 17th century, apparently, they used to practise cannibalism.  Their kings had twenty to thirty wives. The Lunda captured adolescents from the peoples they defeated. These teenagers were turned into slaves and wore an iron necklace to symbolise their status. The slaves would only shed the collar when they had shown the king the severed head of one of the kingdom's enemies. After this, these former slaves were to be incorporated into Lunda society.

After 1608 Lunda people launched several attacks against the Mbundu. This provoked a war between the kingdoms Ndongo and Lunda. After the defeat of the Ndongo, Lunda people based their diet on the cows and pigs they had stolen from kingdom of Ndongo, while their income was based on the sale of Mbundu prisoners to Portuguese merchants. They subsequently became sedentary, migrated to other regions, developed a family system typical of most societies (they married and had children) and became a powerful empire that based part of its income on the sale of slaves, both on a small and large scale. The slave trade was abandoned in the 19th century when the European slave trade ceased.

Demography 
Today the Lunda people comprise hundreds of subgroups such as the Akosa, Imbangala and Ndembu, and number approximately 500,000 in Angola, 750,000 in the Congo, and 200,000 in Zambia. Most speak the Lunda language, Chilunda, except for the Kazembe-Lunda who have adopted the Bemba language of their neighbours.

Notable members
Moïse Tshombe, President of the secessionist State of Katanga and later Prime Minister of the Democratic Republic of the Congo

Notes

References
General references
"Lunda and Chokwe Kingdoms." Country Study: Angola. Library of Congress (October 2005).
"Lunda" Art and Life in Africa Project. University of Iowa Museum of Art
Allafrica.com, Mwati Yamv Preaches Peace At Lunda Lubanza Ceremony, 3 September 2009.
"A crown on the move: stylistic integration of the Luba-Lunda complex in Lunda-Kazembe performance", A crown on the move: stylistic integration of the Luba-Lunda complex in Lunda-Kazembe performance, 2006.
Some of the information is based on the German Wikipedia article on the Lunda (Königreich), which gives two sources: 
Pogge (1880). Im Reich des Muata Jamwo. Berlin.
Buchner (1883). "Das Reich des Muata Jamwo". Deutsche Geographische Blätter. Bremen.

Further reading
Pritchett, James Anthony (2001). The Lunda-Ndembu : style, change, and social transformation in South Central Africa. Madison: University of Wisconsin.
Pritchett, James Anthony (2007). Friends for Life, Friends for Death: cohorts and consciousness among the Lunda-Ndembu. Charlottesville: University of Virginia.

External links

 
Ethnic groups in Zambia
Ethnic groups in Angola
Ethnic groups in the Democratic Republic of the Congo
People from Katanga Province
Bantu peoples